Gibbium psylloides, also known as the hump beetle or the smooth spider beetle (the latter of which it shares with Gibbium aequinoctiale), is a species of spider beetle in the genus Gibbium. It is native to the Palearctic, Southeast Asia, and North Africa. It was first described by Paweł Czenpiński in 1778. North American references to G. psylloides actually refer to Gibbium aequinoctiale.

References
https://my-traveltips.com/

Beetles described in 1778
Bostrichoidea